Veliki Cvjetnić is a village in the municipality of Bihać, Bosnia and Herzegovina.

Demographics 
According to the 2013 census, its population was 53, all Serbs.

References

Populated places in Drvar